Alexander Thomas Emeric Vidal (1792 – 5 February 1863) was an officer of the Royal Navy. He became an accomplished surveyor, and reached the rank of vice-admiral.

Early life
Vidal was born in 1792, the youngest of four children of Emeric Vidal, who served in the Royal Navy.  Alexander followed his father, embarking on a naval career in December 1803 when he joined  as a 1st class volunteer. He served alternately under Sir Charles Hamilton, Michael Seymour and W. Shield. He initially served in the English Channel, off the north coast of Spain and in the West Indies, until November 1805. He later joined the Royal Naval College at Portsmouth, before joining  in November 1809. Here he served under Lord William Stuart, and George Digby. He spent three years aboard the Lavinia at the rank of midshipman, and saw service in the Mediterranean and West Indies, and at Cadiz and Lisbon.

Promotion
He sailed aboard the Conway to the North American Station, and on arrival, spent time on the Great Lakes working in a surveying role. He was briefly employed as flag-lieutenant to Commodore Sir Edward Owen, before receiving his commission, dated February 1815. He accompanied Owen on his voyage to Africa and on his return to England in October 1825, he was promoted to post-captain.

Hunt for Aitkin's Rock

Aitkin's Rock was a supposed rock in the North Atlantic. There had been at least seven separate reports of the potential hazard, said to be small and protruding only about four feet from the water. Francis Beaufort worked out a rough position for the rock and Vidal set out to investigate. He spent six weeks charting the supposed locations and all of the positions in between, without discovering any evidence. Satisfied that the rock was a mere vigia, he returned to port. During his surveys in search of the rock, he discovered and charted Vidal bank, and the next year became the first to accurately chart and describe Rockall.

African mapping
Vidal sailed aboard  in December 1835, carrying 12 chronometers. He intended to calculate the meridian arc length to the Cape Verde Islands, and the west coast of Africa. He eventually carried out detailed surveys all along the African coast, so that by 1838 the Secretary of the Royal Geographical Society could remark of the survey that This tedious undertaking is drawing to a close, and will then be of equal utility to the fair traders and the anti-slavery cruisers. It is fortunately in the hands of such a man as Captain Vidal, R.N., who has steadily devoted himself during a long period of ill-health, to complete this unpopular work, and to connect with it a minute examination of the Canary Islands. Vidal then carried out surveys of the Azores aboard  from September 1841 until January 1845. He then moved aboard the yacht William & Mary to complete the work.

Later life and legacy
Vidal was promoted to rear-admiral on 27 January 1851, and vice-admiral on 17 June 1859. He had married Sarah Antoinette, daughter of Henry Veitch, the Consul General of Madeira, in October 1839 and had two sons, Owen Alexander (b. 1841) and Beaufort Henry (b. 1842). Following his wife's death in 1843, Vidal emigrated to Canada, where he joined his eldest brother Richard Emeric Vidal  in the founding of Sarnia, Ontario. He died at Clifton, Bristol on 5 February 1863, aged 73.

The survey ship , launched in 1951, was named in his honour. In 1955 a party from HMS Vidal were landed on Rockall to claim it as part of the United Kingdom, thus claiming the islet that Alexander Vidal had first surveyed over a hundred years before.

See also

Notes

References

Biography of Vidal

External links

1792 births
1863 deaths
English surveyors
English cartographers
Royal Navy vice admirals
English hydrographers
19th-century Royal Navy personnel
Rockall